Yvonne Baby (18 August 1931 – 3 August 2022) was a French journalist, novelist, and critic.

Life and career
Yvonne was the daughter of historian and political activist  and Ruta Assia, and the stepdaughter of writer and film historian Georges Sadoul.

A journalist and writer, Baby directed the cultural service of the newspaper Le Monde from 1970 to 1985, after which she became a film critic. In 1975, she traveled to Copenhagen to interview Paul Pavlowitch on the mystery of Émile Ajar. She was vice-president of the jury of the 1983 Cannes Film Festival.

Yvonne Baby died on 3 August 2022, at the age of 90.

Works
 (1967)
Le Jour et la Nuit (1974)
Kilroy (1980)
La Vie retrouvée (1992)
Ma mère et le ciel très vite (1998)
Gris paradis (2003)
La Femme du mur (2004)
Quinze hommes splendides (2008)
Le Troisième Ciel (2010)
À l'encre bleu nuit (2014)
Nirvanah (2016)

References

1931 births
2022 deaths
French journalists
20th-century French novelists
21st-century French novelists
Prix Interallié winners